Mercur may refer to:

Places
 Gangsås, an area in the city of Harstad, Norway (also known as Mercur)
 Mercur, Utah, a ghost town in Tooele County, Utah, USA

People
 Ulysses Mercur, a Republican member of the U.S. House of Representatives from Pennsylvania and Chief Justice of the Supreme Court of Pennsylvania

Other
 Magirus Mercur, a German 5-ton truck that was built by Magirus Deutz in Germany from 1951 to 1972
 Radio Mercur, a former Danish offshore broadcasting commercial radio station
 Songa Mercur, a semi-submersible drilling rig designed by Friede & Goldman

See also 
 Merkur (disambiguation)
 Mercury (disambiguation)

de:Mercur